Enikő Németh (born 4 February 1978) is a Hungarian sailor. She competed in the women's 470 event at the 1996 Summer Olympics.

References

External links
 

1978 births
Living people
Hungarian female sailors (sport)
Olympic sailors of Hungary
Sailors at the 1996 Summer Olympics – 470
Sportspeople from Keszthely